Jonathan Vila Pereira (born 6 March 1986) is a Spanish professional footballer who plays as a defensive midfielder.

Club career
Vila was born in O Porriño, Province of Pontevedra. Brought through the youth ranks of local team RC Celta de Vigo, he made his La Liga debut on 17 December 2006, playing 14 minutes in a 1–1 away draw against Levante UD. He totalled ten official appearances during the season, including three (also as a substitute) in the campaign's UEFA Cup as the Galicians were eventually relegated.

Vila was definitely promoted to the main squad for 2008–09, with Celta now in the Segunda División. He contributed 15 matches – 13 starts – in the 2011–12 campaign, to help the club return to the top flight after an absence of five years.

In January 2014, completely ostracised by new manager Luis Enrique, Vila was loaned to Beitar Jerusalem F.C. of the Israeli Premier League until June. In July, he terminated his contract with Celta and signed with Real Oviedo of Segunda División B.

On 23 August 2018, Vila joined Indian Super League franchise FC Pune City after one season with Recreativo de Huelva in the Spanish third tier.

Club statistics

Honours
Oviedo
Segunda División B: 2014–15

References

External links

Celta de Vigo biography 

1986 births
Living people
Spanish footballers
Footballers from O Porriño
Association football midfielders
Association football utility players
La Liga players
Segunda División players
Segunda División B players
Celta de Vigo B players
RC Celta de Vigo players
Real Oviedo players
Recreativo de Huelva players
Coruxo FC players
Israeli Premier League players
Beitar Jerusalem F.C. players
Indian Super League players
FC Pune City players
Spanish expatriate footballers
Expatriate footballers in Israel
Expatriate footballers in India
Spanish expatriate sportspeople in Israel
Spanish expatriate sportspeople in India